The Real World: London is the fourth season of MTV's reality television series The Real World, which focuses on a group of diverse strangers living together for several months in a different city each season, as cameras follow their lives and interpersonal relationships. It is the only season of The Real World to be filmed in the United Kingdom.

The season featured seven people and is the first of four seasons of The Real World to be filmed entirely outside of the United States, being followed by The Real World: Paris in 2003, The Real World: Sydney in 2007, The Real World: Cancun in 2009.

The cast moved into the Notting Hill Gate flat in January 1995, and lived there for five months, moving out in mid-June. The season premiered on June 28 of that year, and was viewed by 2.7 million people.

Regarding following the emotional high points provided by the struggles of Pedro Zamora and David "Puck" Rainey the previous season, series co-creator Jon Murray stated, "In terms of big dramatic issues, there's no way we could match that. So this year plays on more of a Moonlighting, romantic-comedy kind of feel." The most notable event of the season occurs when cast member and singer Neil Forrester kisses a male heckler during a performance, who then bites the tip of Forrester's tongue off. This event earned Forrester a place among other reality television personalities who have been injured during filming on MTV's 2008 "E.R. All-Stars". The season also features a guest appearance by Blues Traveler, whose lead singer, John Popper, dedicates a song to cast member Jay Frank, an aspiring playwright and fan of the band.

Season changes
This is the first season of The Real World to be set outside the United States. The cast is also the only cast to be predominately made up of non-Americans, with three Americans, two Britons, a German and an Australian.

The residence

The cast lived in a 6,000-square-foot, three-story, four bedroom, renovated townhouse at 18 Powis Terrace in the trendy Notting Hill neighbourhood of London. The ground floor of the building is leased to ScreenFace, a professional make-up supply company.

Cast
Producers considered 25,000 applicants for casting. The seven selected were not well-acquainted with the series. The two American men chosen to help appease the home audience, Jay Frank and Mike Johnson, were not impressed with what little they had seen of it, with Johnson relating that he channel-surfed past it, saying, "This is stupid. I want videos." Entertainment Weeklys Bruce Fretts says that this ignorance precluded them from aping the behavior of past seasons' casts.

: Age at the time of filming.

Episodes

After filming
At the 2008 The Real World Awards Bash, Jacinda received a nomination for "Hottest Female"."The Real World Awards Bash: Winners" . MTV.com. 2008. Retrieved January 17, 2008.

Neil Forrester became a researcher and academic in England specializing in the field of developmental disorders and language at the University of London.

Jay Frank graduated from City College of New York with a degree in Broadcast Journalism. He subsequently became a morning live reporter and then a morning anchor in the Tri-Cities, Washington area before becoming the main anchor for KOHD-TV in Bend, Oregon. He wrote another play, Ten Cent Treasure, which plays locally in the Tri-Cities area. He then began work at a Pasco, Washington television station KEPR as a weatherman and occasional morning anchor, with his own Tuesday segment "Will it work?"

Mike Johnson and his wife, Cheryl, run a real estate business. Mike is also the team manager for the Stevenson Motorsports Grand-Am road racing team.

Lars Schlichting lives in the United States, and runs his own company that deals with DJ equipment. He is also a nationwide consultant and trainer for Pioneer ProDJ.

Jacinda Barrett went on to become a feature film actress, appearing in such films as The Namesake, The Human Stain, and The Last Kiss. In 2004 she married actor Gabriel Macht. On August 20, 2007 she gave birth to a daughter, Geraldine Macht, in Los Angeles.Salvatore, Rosanne, 2011. Page 11 of 44

Sharon Gitau works as a singer, songwriter, composer and producer.

The ChallengeBold''' indicates the contestant was a finalist on The Challenge''.

References

External links

Official site at MTV.com
The Real World: London: Cast Bios MTV.

Sharon Gitau's website
Mike Johnson's racing website

London
Television shows set in London
1995 American television seasons
Television shows shot in London